The Slovakia national speedway team are motorcycle speedway national team from Slovakia.

World championships

Speedway World Cup

Team U-21

European Championships

Pairs

Honours

World Championships

European Championships

See also
 motorcycle speedway

National speedway teams
Speedway
Team